Malcolm A. MacKay (born January 29, 1944) is a Canadian politician. He represented the electoral district of Sackville in the Nova Scotia House of Assembly from 1978 to 1984. He was a member of the Nova Scotia Progressive Conservative Party.

MacKay was born in Dartmouth, Nova Scotia. Educated in Montreal at Sir George Williams University and Collège Sainte-Marie de Montréal, he was a telephone technician. In 1962, he married Claudia June Burns.

After serving two years on Halifax County Council, MacKay entered provincial politics in the 1978 election, defeating Liberal incumbent George Doucet in the new Sackville riding. He was re-elected in the 1981 election. In the 1984 election, MacKay was defeated by New Democrat John Holm, finishing third behind Liberal Bill MacDonald. Controversy arose during the campaign, when MacKay admitted he used a false address to claim expenses as a member living away from the capital. In April 1985, an Auditor General's report asked MacKay to repay over $7,000 in extra expenses. The money was paid back and MacKay was not charged criminally.

In February 2004, a political comeback bid ended when MacKay's candidacy for the Conservative nomination in Halifax West for the 2004 federal election was rejected by the party. MacKay attempted to return to provincial politics in the 2006 election, running for the Nova Scotia Liberal Party in Hants East, but finished third.

References

Living people
1944 births
Progressive Conservative Association of Nova Scotia MLAs
People from Dartmouth, Nova Scotia
People from Sackville, Nova Scotia
Sir George Williams University alumni
Nova Scotia municipal councillors
20th-century Canadian politicians